Don't Go To Sleep is a 1982 American made-for-television horror film that was produced and directed by Richard Lang. The movie features Dennis Weaver, Valerie Harper, Ruth Gordon, and Robert Webber, and youngsters Kristin Cumming, Robin Ignico, and Oliver Robins.

The film focuses on daughter Mary's encounters with the ghost of her late sister, Jennifer, who perished in a car accident and is out for revenge.

Plot
A family of four including parents, Phillip and Laura, son Kevin and daughter Mary move to a new home; they are accompanied by Grandma Bernice, for whom no one other than Laura cares very much. Mourning the recent loss of daughter Jennifer, the family is looking to put the tragedy behind them and start a new life.

After moving in, Mary hears what sounds like her dead sister's voice calling to her from beneath the bed. When she checks it out, Mary's stunned to find that her sister has returned as a ghost. Jennifer appears to Mary numerous times in secret, ultimately communicating her desire to kill the entire family, except for Mary, as an act of revenge.

Following this revelation from Mary, the family members suffer an assortment of twisted fates: the appearance of Kevin's pet iguana in Grandma Bernice's bed causes the elderly woman to suffer a fatal heart attack; Kevin's attempt to retrieve a Frisbee from the roof results in a deadly fall; the radio Phillip listens to while bathing ends up electrocuting him. Laura barely escapes, injuring her arm.

Based on the belief that she committed the murders, Mary is placed in a mental institution and soon experiences a flashback concerning Jennifer's fate. In the flashback, while riding home from their grandmother's house, Kevin convinces Mary to play a prank on Jennifer and they tie her shoelaces together. Aside from being jealous of their parents' favoritism toward their sister, Kevin and Mary are fed up with Jennifer's constant bullying. When a van collides with their car, everyone except Jennifer manages to escape. She screams for help as Mary runs to inform her father of Jennifer's plight, but Phillip is unable to rescue her before the car bursts into flames. Back in the present, Mary now claims that she is actually Jennifer; the deceased sister has possessed her living sister. Mary screams for Jennifer not to leave and that she "loved her".

Later, as Laura sleeps in her bedroom, she is awakened by a sound at the foot of her bed. Jennifer's ghost pops up and says, "Hi, Mommy."

Cast
 Valerie Harper as Laura
 Dennis Weaver as Phillip
 Ruth Gordon as Bernice
 Oliver Robins as Kevin
 Robin Ignico as Mary
 Kristin Cumming as Jennifer
 Claudette Nevins as Dr. Robin Samuel 
 Robert Webber as Dr. Cole
 Marilyn Coleman as Sarah
 Tim Haldeman as the Intern
 Haven Earle Haley as the Priest
 Ned Wynn as the Paramedic
 Ross Porter as the Radio Sportscaster (voice)

Reception

Don't Go to Sleep garnered positive reviews upon its initial broadcast, earning praise for its suspense and strong performances. 
Maitland McDonagh of TV Guide awarded the film three out of five stars, commending the film's acting, screenplay, and suspense, calling it "a tight, genuinely scary made-for-TV thriller". Todd Martin from HorrorNews.net offered similar praise for the performances, suspense, and script, as well as the film's ominous tone, and soundtrack. Brian Collins, in a retrospective on Birth.Movies.Death, lauded the film's scares, performances, and mounting tension for retaining their effectiveness years after its first release, although Collins did note that the film's pacing was slower than it should be.

References

External links
 
 
 

1982 horror films
ABC network original films
American ghost films
American supernatural horror films
American horror television films
1982 television films
1982 films
ABC Motion Pictures films
Films directed by Richard Lang (director)
1980s English-language films
1980s American films